Lost in Siberia is a 1991 Soviet-British film by Alexander Mitta. It was shot entirely in Russia, either on location or at Mosfilm Studio. The post-production was started at Mosfilm Studio and completed in London. The film was selected as the British entry for the Best Foreign Language Film at the 64th Academy Awards, but was not accepted as a nominee.

Plot
The film follows Andrei Miller, an English archaeologist played by Anthony Andrews, as he gets arrested while doing a special assignment for the Shah of Iran. Mistaken for an English spy with the same name, he gets sent to a labor camp. On the way he meets a Japanese prisoner who speaks some English. He testifies to the military officer that he is totally innocent and asks him to contact the royal family. Most of the movie is a very realistic and ugly picture of the terrible plight of prisoners in Siberia during the Stalin years. Human life has absolutely no value. The only place he finally finds human kindness is when he is dying and is sent to the hospital. A romance develops between him and the camp's doctor, which attracts the anger of the camp's chief who is hoping to marry Anna, the young blond female doctor. Miller gets sent to one of the infamous Kolyma labour camps, and the camp's chief becomes even more evil and hateful towards all the prisoners left in his command. In an ambiguous ending, word comes to the camp that the Shah of Iran and his wife are asking that he be freed. He is released and goes back to his pleasant life, or that is just a delusion that he has while dying of cold and hunger.

Cast
 Anthony Andrews as Andrei Miller
 Vladimir Ilyin as Captain Malakhov
 Elena Mayorova as Anna  
 Irina Mikhalyova as Lilka 
 Aleksandr Gureyev as Sergeant Konyaev
 Valentin Gaft as Beria
 Aleksei Zharkov as Nikola, robber
 Natalya Gundareva as Faina
 Zinoviy Gerdt as Levenson
 Nikolai Pastukhov as Misha
 Lyubov Sokolova as Klava
 Albert Filozov as Lilka's father

Awards
The film was Britain's entry to the Cannes Festival's competition in 1991 and was nominated as the Best Foreign Language Film at the 49th Golden Globe Awards.

See also
 List of submissions to the 64th Academy Awards for Best Foreign Language Film
 List of British submissions for the Academy Award for Best Foreign Language Film

References

External links
 

Soviet romantic drama films
Russian romantic drama films
English-language Russian films
English-language Soviet films
1990s Russian-language films
Films directed by Alexander Mitta
Russian multilingual films
1991 multilingual films
British multilingual films
Soviet multilingual films
1990s English-language films
Films set in Siberia
Works about the Gulag